LGA may refer to:

 Labor–Green Accord, 1989, between political parties in Tasmania, Australia
 LaGuardia Airport, New York City, US, IATA code
 Land grid array, a microprocessor surface-mount package
 Landesgewerbeanstalt Bayern, a German certification company
 Lansing Grand River Assembly, a General Motors automobile assembly plant
 Large for gestational age
 Lattice gas automaton, a type of cellular automaton
 Liptako–Gourma Authority, a regional development organization in Africa
 Local government area, in several countries
 Local Government Association, England and Wales
 Local government areas of Nigeria, 2nd level administrative division of Nigeria